Abdallah Mahmoud Said Bekhit (born 13 July 1985) is an Egyptian professional footballer who plays as an attacking midfielder and captain for Pyramids and the Egypt national team.

In May 2018 he was named in Egypt's preliminary squad for the 2018 FIFA World Cup in Russia.

Club career
El Said agreed to a three-year contract extension with Ismaily in May 2007.

In 2011 after various problems with his team and due to Ismaily's need for money and after long negotiations, El Said signed with Al Ahly despite earlier reports assuring that he is going to sign with Zamalek due to Ismaily's bitter rivalry with Ahly.

El Said made his debut with Al Ahly against ENPPI, he scored 4 goals in his first season before it was cancelled due to the Egyptian Revolution of 2011.

On 10 April 2018, El Said joined Finish side KuPS on loan for two months. Following the conclusion of the loan, he joined Saudi Arabian side Al-Ahli Saudi. In January 2019, El Said joined the Egyptian side Pyramids.

Career statistics

Club Carrer Stats

International
Statistics accurate as of match played 6 February 2022.

International goals
Scores and results list Egypt's goal tally first.

Honours
Al Ahly
Egyptian Premier League: 2013–14, 2015–16, 2016–17, 2017–18
Egypt Cup: 2016–17
Egyptian Super Cup: 2011, 2015, 2017
CAF Champions League: 2012, 2013
CAF Confederation Cup: 2014
CAF Super Cup: 2013, 2014

Individual
Egyptian Premier League top goalscorer: 2019–20

References

External links

1985 births
Living people
Egyptian footballers
Egypt international footballers
Association football midfielders
Al-Ahli Saudi FC players
Ismaily SC players
Al Ahly SC players
Kuopion Palloseura players
Pyramids FC players
2017 Africa Cup of Nations players
People from Ismailia Governorate
Egyptian expatriate sportspeople in Saudi Arabia
Expatriate footballers in Saudi Arabia
Expatriate footballers in Finland
Egyptian Premier League players
Veikkausliiga players
Saudi Professional League players
2018 FIFA World Cup players
2019 Africa Cup of Nations players
2021 Africa Cup of Nations players